Porfirio Jiménez Barrera (born September 15, 1965) is a Mexican football manager and former player.

He was born in Mexico City.

External links

1965 births
Living people
Mexican footballers
Mexican football managers
Association football midfielders
Cruz Azul footballers
C.F. Monterrey players
Tecos F.C. footballers
Liga MX players
Footballers from Mexico City